Hadash-Ta'al is a joint list of the Ta'al party and Hadash political coalition. The list was established for the first time in 2003 for the election to the 16th Knesset, and ran again in the elections of April 2019 and 2022.

History 
The list ran in the 2003 legislative election, and won three seats. In the 2006 legislative election, Hadash ran independently, while Ta'al ran as part of the Ra'am-Ta'al list.

In the 20th Knesset, the parties were part of the Joint List faction. Ahead of the April 2019 legislative election, Ta'al split from the faction, but finally Hadash and Ta'al united once more. At the head of the list was Hadash chairman Ayman Odeh, and in second place was Ta'al's chairman Ahmad Tibi. The leadership of the list was to be shared. On March 6, 2019, the Central Elections Committee for the 21st Knesset decided to disqualify the list candidate Ofer Kasif, contrary to the position of the Attorney General. The Supreme Court overturned the disqualification.

In the April 2019 legislative election, the list won 193,442 votes, which is six seats in the Knesset. For the next election, the two parties returned to the Joint List. Ahead of the 2022 legislative election, the Joint List broke up again, when Balad decided to submit a separate list from the other parties that were members of the Joint List, and therefore Hadash and Ta'al reached an agreement to run jointly, with Hadash chairman Ayman Odeh in first place, and Ta'al leader Ahmed Tibi in second.

References 

Arab political parties in Israel
All stub articles
Political parties established in 2003
Political parties disestablished in 2006
Political parties established in 2019
Political parties disestablished in 2019
Political parties established in 2022